Beerzerveld is a village in the Dutch province of Overijssel. It is a part of the municipality of Ommen, and lies about 16 km north of Almelo.

It was first mentioned in 1860 as Beerzerveld, and means "heath near Beerze". Around 1860, people moved to Beerzerveld to excavate the peat. The hamlet nowadays cooperates with Mariënberg.

References

Populated places in Overijssel
Ommen